Yusmay Bicet Planas (born 1 December 1983) is a Cuban triple jumper.

Her personal best jump is 14.61 metres, achieved in March 2004 in Havana, Cuba .

Achievements

External links

1983 births
Living people
Cuban female triple jumpers
Athletes (track and field) at the 2003 Pan American Games
Athletes (track and field) at the 2004 Summer Olympics
Olympic athletes of Cuba
Pan American Games medalists in athletics (track and field)
Pan American Games bronze medalists for Cuba
Medalists at the 2003 Pan American Games